HNLMS Abraham van der Hulst was a ship of the  of multi-purpose frigates of the Royal Netherlands Navy where it used the radio call sign was "PAMF". Built by the shipyard Koninklijke Schelde Groep in Vlissingen. The ship is named after the Dutch Admiral Abraham van der Hulst. She was sold to the Chilean Navy where the ship was renamed Almirante Blanco Encalada.

Dutch service
HNLMS Abraham van der Hulst was one of six s that were built at the Koninklijke Schelde Groep in Vlissingen. The keel laying took place on 8 February 1989 and the launching on 7 September 1991. The ship was put into service on 15 December 1993.

13 February 1998 while off Corsica serving in the NATO squadron STANAVFORMED she received orders to steam through the Suez canal to the Persian Gulf to join a UN operation to enforce a trade embargo on Iraq. This lasted until 31 May that year. After this she was sent to Eritrea to assist with the evacuation of European citizens.

The ship took part in Operation Enduring Freedom around the Arabian Peninsula.

In 2004 the vessel was decommissioned and sold to the Chilean Navy.

Chilean service history

The ship was put into service on 16 December 2005 where the ship was renamed Almirante Blanco Encalada.

Notes

External links 
 Nederlandse-marine.nl scheepvaartmuseum.nl :: Maritieme kalender 1998
 Nederlandse-marine.nl scheepvaartmuseum.nl :: Maritieme kalender 2002

Karel Doorman-class frigates
Karel Doorman-class frigates of the Chilean Navy
1991 ships